Monte Generoso (also known as Calvagione) is a mountain of the Lugano Prealps, located on the border between Switzerland and Italy and between Lake Lugano and Lake Como. The western and southern flanks of the mountain lie in the Swiss canton of Ticino, whilst the north-eastern flanks are in the Italian region of Lombardy.

The view from the summit of the mountain encompasses the lakes of Lugano, Como, Varese and Maggiore. To the north are the Alps, stretching from the Matterhorn via the Jungfrau and the Saint-Gotthard Massif to the Bernina Range. To the south are the Lombardy Plains and the Po Valley, with the city of Milan and the Apennine Mountains visible on a clear day.

The summit can be approached by the Monte Generoso Railway, a rack railway that starts from Capolago in Switzerland, and climbs via the western flank of the mountain. The summit station includes a panoramic terrace and buffet, a restaurant and a hotel. The new restaurant Fiore di pietra (stone flower) designed by the architect Mario Botta was inaugurated on 29 March 2017.

Hiking trails reach the summit from different starting points, including Bellavista, Capolago and Mendrisio.

The Monte Generoso Observatory is located adjacent to the railway's summit station, and is operated by the Monte Generoso Insubrica Astronomy Group. Also nearby is a small chapel dating from the 20th century.

The area is included in the Federal Inventory of Landscapes and Natural Monuments. The mountain slopes are home to a herd of between 300 and 350 chamois.

The artist and author Edward Lear spent summers from 1878 to 1883 on the mountain. His oil painting The Plains of Lombardy from Monte Generoso is in the Ashmolean Museum in the English city of Oxford.

See also
 Monte Generoso railway
List of mountains of Switzerland
List of mountains of Ticino
List of mountains of Switzerland accessible by public transport

References

External links 
 
 Monte Generoso Railway website
 Monte Generoso on Hikr
 Monte Generoso on Summitpost

Generoso
Generoso
Generoso
Tourist attractions in Switzerland
Italy–Switzerland border
International mountains of Europe
Generoso
Mountains of Switzerland
One-thousanders of Switzerland
Lugano Prealps